Al-Fathiyah Madrasa  is a madrasah complex in Damascus, Syria. It was built in 1743 by an Ottoman official named Fethi Al-Defterdar.

See also
 Al-Adiliyah Madrasa
 Az-Zahiriyah Library

References

Mausoleums in Syria
School buildings completed in 1743
Madrasas in Damascus
1740s establishments in Ottoman Syria
18th-century establishments in Ottoman Syria